DeAngelo Lamond Willingham (born January 15, 1987) is a former American football cornerback for the Virginia Destroyers of the United Football League. He was signed by the Tampa Bay Buccaneers as an undrafted free agent in 2009. He played college football at Tennessee.

Willingham was also a member of the Dallas Cowboys, Seattle Seahawks, Cincinnati Bengals, and New England Patriots.

Early years
Willingham attended Calhoun County High School in St. Matthews, South Carolina, where he was a three-year starter at defensive back, wide receiver, and kick returner. He was a PrepStar All-American selection in 2004. He also played basketball, where he was a three-year starter at guard. In track and field, Willingham was a regional finalist in the 4 × 100 meter relay.

College career

Junior college
Following high school, Willingham attended the College of the Desert in Palm Desert, California, where he was a two-year starter at cornerback. He was a two-time all-conference selection. As a freshman, he had three interceptions, while as a sophomore he had five interceptions and one forced fumble.

University of Tennessee
After junior college, Willingham attended the University of Tennessee. In 2007, he started eight games, recording 38 tackles. As a senior in 2008, he started 10 games and had three interceptions.

Professional career

Tampa Bay Buccaneers
After going undrafted in the 2009 NFL Draft, Willingham signed with the Tampa Bay Buccaneers. He was waived by the team on August 29, 2009.

Dallas Cowboys
Willingham was claimed off waivers by the Dallas Cowboys on August 30, 2009; however, he was waived during the team's final cuts six days later.

First stint with the Patriots
On September 6, 2009, Willingham was signed to the practice squad of the New England Patriots. He was released on September 21, 2009.

Seattle Seahawks
On November 3, 2009, the Seattle Seahawks signed Willingham to their practice squad, where he spent the remainder of the season. He was re-signed to a future contract on January 6, 2010, but was waived by the team on April 28, 2010.

Cincinnati Bengals
Willingham was claimed off waivers by the Cincinnati Bengals on April 29, 2010. He was later waived on June 18, 2010.

Second stint with the Patriots
Willingham was signed again by the Patriots on August 9, 2010. He was waived during final cuts on September 4, 2010.

External links
New England Patriots bio
Seattle Seahawks bio
Tennessee Volunteers bio 
Just Sports Stats

1987 births
Living people
People from St. Matthews, South Carolina
Players of American football from South Carolina
American football cornerbacks
American football safeties
Tennessee Volunteers football players
Tampa Bay Buccaneers players
Dallas Cowboys players
New England Patriots players
Seattle Seahawks players
Cincinnati Bengals players
Virginia Destroyers players
College of the Desert Roadrunners football players